Galiszewo  is a village in the administrative district of Gmina Skulsk, within Konin County, Greater Poland Voivodeship, in west-central Poland.

The village has a population of 160.

References

Galiszewo